Ngarutjaranya, also known as Mount Woodroffe (officially Ngarutjaranya/Mount Woodroffe), is a mountain in the Australian state of South Australia, located in the Anangu Pitjantjatjara Yankunytjatjara lands in the state's northwest.

Cultural significance 
The name of the mountain comes from the Pitjantjatjara language.
In Pitjantjatjara mythology, the mountain embodies the mythological creature Ngintaka.

Geography 
Ngarutjaranya is located in the far northwest of South Australia, in the Musgrave Ranges.  The mountain range rises some 700–800 metres from the surrounding plains and comprises massifs of granite and gneiss.

History 
William Ernest Giles was the first European man to pass through the area and camped to the south of Woodroffe on September 7, 1873.  William Christie Gosse had previously named it Mt Woodroffe on July 20 that same year.  Woodroffe was named after George Woodroffe Goyder, Surveyor-General of South Australia and an early Australian explorer.

In the 1960s, Ngarutjaranya was considered as a potential site for the proposed  Anglo-Australian Telescope (AAT).  It lost out due to its remoteness compared to  Siding Spring in New South Wales, where the AAT sits today amongst other astronomical observatories.

Access 
Access is limited as a permit is required to enter the Anangu Pitjantjatjara lands.

See also
List of mountains in Australia

References

External links 
 State8.net Mount Woodroffe
 Bonzle.com profile page

Ngarutjaranya
Ngarutjaranya